Wakamiya may refer to:

Places
Wakamiya, Fukuoka, a town located in Kurate District, Fukuoka Prefecture, Japan that in 2006, along with the town of Miyata (also from Kurate District), was merged to create the city of Miyawaka
Wakamiya Station, a railway station on the Tadami Line in the town of Aizubange, Fukushima Prefecture, Japan, operated by East Japan Railway Company (JR East).
Keta Wakamiya Shrine, a Shinto shrine located in the city of Hida, Gifu Prefecture, Japan also commonly referred to as "Sugimoto-sama"
Wakamiya Ōji, a 1.8 km street in Kamakura, a city in Kanagawa Prefecture in Japan, unusual because it is at the same time the city's main avenue and the approach (sandō (参道)) of its largest Shinto shrine, Tsurugaoka Hachiman-gū

People
Kenji Wakamiya (born 1961), Japanese politician, a member of the House of Representatives in the Diet (national legislature).

Ships and carriers
 , a seaplane carrier of the Imperial Japanese Navy and the first Japanese aircraft carrier. Converted from a transport ship in 1914. she was stricken in 1931
Japanese escort ship Wakamiya, an  launched in 1943 and sunk the same year
Wakamiya-maru, a Japanese cargo ship whose crew members became the first Japanese to circumnavigate the globe after their ship went off course after getting caught in a storm en route from Ishinomaki in the Tōhoku region of northern Japan to Edo (now Tokyo) in November 1793.